Michael (Mike) Pingitore (or Pingatore) (1888–1952) was a member of Paul Whiteman's Orchestra. Whiteman discovered him playing tenor banjo and he became part of the rhythm section for his newly-formed band for the Alexandria Hotel in Los Angeles (later known as the original Whiteman band), playing there for its entire existence (1919–1948) except for a brief period in 1923 due to illness. Pingitore played banjo on Art Mooney's "I'm Looking Over a Four Leaf Clover", which was a number one hit on the Billboard magazine pop chart in 1948. He was inducted into the American Banjo Museum Hall of Fame in 2005.

See also
 Banjo Hall of Fame Members

References

American jazz banjoists
1888 births
1952 deaths